Estadio Francisco A. Micheli (formerly known as Romana, in reference to the city where it is located) is a private multipurpose stadium dedicated mainly to the sport of baseball. Located in the city of La Romana, with a capacity for about 10,000 people, is the home of the Dominican professional team Toros del Este.  The stadium was inaugurated in 1979 by President Antonio Guzmán Fernández and is owned by the Central Romana Corporation. In 1998 the stadium suffered damage as a result of Hurricane Georges, which went through much of the Dominican Republic during that year.

References 

1979 establishments in the Dominican Republic
La Romana, Dominican Republic
Baseball venues in the Dominican Republic
Buildings and structures in La Romana Province
Sports venues completed in 1979